Delta Psi Delta may refer to:
 Delta Psi Delta (Canada), a Canadian National Sorority
 Delta Psi Delta, a local fraternity at Linfield University in McMinnville, Oregon
 Delta Psi Delta, a local fraternity at California State University, Chico
 Delta Psi Delta (Dartmouth), a former coed Greek organization at Dartmouth College in Hanover, New Hampshire which went dormant in 1991.